Unseen Evil is a 2001 supernatural horror film directed by Jay Woelfel. It was released on 12 November 2001. It was followed by a 2004 sequel, Unseen Evil 2.

Plot
A college professor and a clique of hikers embark on a quest for an archaic Indian burial ground in the woods. Upon stumbling across what is most likely the searched for spot, three members of the squad turn against the rest and restrain them in order to ransack the gravesite.

In due course, one of the looters comes upon a crown that unleashes a monster that commences a killing spree which sends the party into a frenzy for their lives.

Cast
 Richard Hatch as Dr. Peter Jensen
 Tim Thomerson as Ranger Chuck MacNeil
 Cindi Braun as Kate
 Frank Ruotolo as Mike
 Jere Jon as Williams
 Cindy Pena as Dana
 Robbie Rist as Bob
 Benjamin Cline as Native Elder #1
 Herve Estrada as Native Elder #2
 Vincent Whipple as Native Brave
 Daryl Berg as Native Girl
 Mark Craig as Ranger #2

References

External links

2001 films
2001 horror films
2000s monster movies
American supernatural horror films
Native American cemeteries in popular culture
2000s English-language films
2000s American films